Norway Township may refer to the following places in the United States:

 Norway Township, Humboldt County, Iowa
 Norway Township, Winnebago County, Iowa
 Norway Township, Wright County, Iowa, Wright County, Iowa
 Norway Township, Republic County, Kansas
 Norway Township, Michigan
 Norway Township, Fillmore County, Minnesota
 Norway Township, Kittson County, Minnesota
 Norway Township, Traill County, North Dakota Traill County, North Dakota
 West Norway Township, Wells County, North Dakota, Wells County, North Dakota
 Norway Township, Clay County, South Dakota, Clay County, South Dakota
 Norway Township, Lincoln County, South Dakota, Lincoln County, South Dakota
 Norway Township, Roberts County, South Dakota, Roberts County, South Dakota
 Norway Township, Turner County, South Dakota, Turner County, South Dakota

See also 

 Norway Lake Township (disambiguation)
 Norway (disambiguation)

Township name disambiguation pages